Eric William Tonkin (11 January 1894 – 10 December 1958) was an Australian rules footballer who played with Melbourne in the Victorian Football League (VFL).

Notes

External links 

 

1894 births
1958 deaths
Australian rules footballers from Victoria (Australia)
Players of Australian handball
Melbourne Football Club players
North Melbourne Football Club (VFA) players
Sturt Football Club players